Tachibana (written: 橘 or 立花) is a Japanese surname.

Classical period 
Tachibana Dōsetsu (立花 道雪, 1513–1585), Japanese samurai of the Sengoku period
Tachibana Ginchiyo (立花 誾千代, 1569–1602), head of the Tachibana clan during the Sengoku Period, daughter of Tachibana Dōsetsu
Tachibana Muneshige (立花 宗茂, 1567–1642), samurai during the Azuchi–Momoyama period, adopted son of Tachibana Dōsetsu

Cf. Tachibana clan (kuge)

Modernity 
Tachibana Kōichirō (立花小一郎, 1861-1925), general in the Imperial Japanese Navy and pre-war politician
Tachibana Shūta (橘周太, 1865-1904), Russo-Japanese War hero
Yoshio Tachibana (立花 芳夫, 1890–1946), lieutenant general in the World War II Imperial Japanese Army, executed for war crimes
Zuicho Tachibana (橘 瑞超, 1890-1968), Buddhist priest and archaeologist, explorer of the East Asia
, Japanese weightlifter
Shinnosuke Tachibana (立花 慎之介, born 1978), Japanese voice actor
Keita Tachibana (橘 慶太, born 1985), lead singer of the J-pop boy band w-inds.
, Japanese voice actor
Rika Tachibana (立花 理香, born 1987), Japanese voice actress and model
, Japanese footballer
, political activist

Fictional characters

Film
Taizo and Yuri Tachibana, a commander in the Japanese Maritime Self-Defense Force and his reporter daughter, in the film Godzilla, Mothra & King Ghidorah: Giant Monsters All-Out Attack

Live-action TV shows
Tobei Tachibana, a character in the tokusatsu television series Kamen Rider, Kamen Rider V3, Kamen Rider X, Kamen Rider Amazon, and Kamen Rider Stronger
Sakuya Tachibana, a character in the tokusatsu television show Kamen Rider Blade
Dr. Tachibana Wato, a character in the Sherlock Holmes-themed drama series Miss Sherlock

Manga and anime
Kaoru Tachibana (立花かおる, Tachibana Kaoru), a character from the manga Dash Kappei
Akira Tachibana, main character of manga and anime After the Rain
Ryoki Tachibana, a character in the shōjo manga Hot Gimmick
An Tachibana and Kippei Tachibana, characters in the shōnen manga The Prince of Tennis
Asuka Tachibana, a character in the anime television series s-CRY-ed
Ryohei Tachibana, a character in the OVA anime Sky Girls
Shito Tachibana, a character in the manga Zombie-Loan
Masao and Kazuo Tachibana, characters in the manga and anime Captain Tsubasa
Several characters in the comedy manga Atashin'chi
Wataru Tachibana, a character in the manga series Hayate the Combat Butler
Tachibana General Labs, an information technology corporation in Serial Experiments Lain
Hideo Tachibana, a character from the shōnen manga H2
Kanade Tachibana, a character from the anime series Angel Beats!
Rina Tachibana (立花 利奈, Tachibana Rina), a character from the manga and anime series Mushi-Uta
Himeko Tachibana (立花 姫子, Tachibana Himeko), a character from the anime series K-On!
Misato Tachibana (立花 みさと), a secondary character from the manga and anime Nichijou
Mihoshi Tachibana (立花 みほし), a secondary character from the manga and anime Nichijou
Chizuru Tachibana (立花 千鶴), a character in the manga/anime Why the Hell are You Here, Teacher!?
Junichi Tachibana (橘 純一) and Miya Tachibana (橘 美也), the characters from the dating sim and anime Amagami SS
Sara and Nina Tachibana (タチバナ・サラ/ニナ), characters from the manga and anime Citrus
Makie Otono-Tachibana, a character from Blade of the Immortal
Rei Tachibana, a character from the manga and anime Pani Poni Dash!
Rintaro Tachibana, a character in the manga Dragons Rioting
Mei Tachibana, the protagonist of the manga and anime Say "I love you"
Makoto Tachibana, a character in the anime Free!
Marika Tachibana  (橘 万里花), a character in the anime and manga Nisekoi
, a character in the anime series Gatchaman Crowds
Tachibana, an upperclassman and one of Mei Misaki's few friends in the manga Another
Hibiki Tachibana, the main character in Senki Zesshou Symphogear
Tomoe Tachibana in Absolute Duo
Taki Tachibana, one of the protagonists of Kimi no Na wa
Subaru Tachibana, the main protagonist of Akame Zero
Hotaru Tachibana, one of the protagonists of Aoharu x Machinegun
Hiromi Tachibana (立花 ヒロミ), or Hilary in the English dub, one of the protagonists of Beyblade
Yuki Tachibana, protagonist of Taiyō Matsumoto's manga GoGo Monster
Aiko Tachibana, is one of the protagonists of A.I.C.O. -Incarnation-
Rui Tachibana & Hina Tachibana, sister characters from the manga/anime Domestic Girlfriend
Hinata Tachibana (橘 日向), a character in the anime and manga Tokyo Revengers
Naoto Tachibana, a character in the anime and manga Tokyo Revengers
Mikan Tachibana, a character in the anime Atashinchi
Yuzuhiko Tachibana, a sibling of Mikan Tachibana 
Mother, one of the parents of Mikan and Yuzuhiko
Father, the other parent of Mikan and Yuzuhiko

Gaming
 Several characters in the Fatal Frame video game series
 Maria Tachibana, a character in the media franchise Sakura Wars
 Ukyo Tachibana, a character in the Samurai Shodown video game series
 Tomoe Tachibana, a character in the Trauma Team videogame
 Shigure Tachibana, an elderly character in the Morenatsu visual novel
 Ayako, Kaishu, and Ryoma (only mentioned by Kaishu, not actually in the game) Tachibana from SimCity DS
 Lindo Tachibana in Dance With Devils
 Arisu Tachibana, an idol from the video game The Idolmaster Cinderella Girls
 Tetsu Tachibana, a central character in the video game Yakuza 0.
 Kanon Tachibana, one of the team leaders in the video game Neo: The World Ends with You

Japanese-language surnames